Mangabe is a rural municipality in the district of Toamasina II (district), in the region of Atsinanana, on east coast of Madagascar.

Economy
The economy is based on agriculture.

References

Populated places in Atsinanana